Christine Arron (born 13 September 1973) is a former track and field sprinter, who competed internationally for France in the 60 metres, 100 metres, 200 metres and the 4 × 100 metres relay. She is one of the ten fastest female 100 metres sprinter of all time with 10.73 secs, which is still the European record. She set the record when winning at the 1998 European Championships, where she also won a gold medal in the 4 × 100 m relay. Also in the relay, she is a 2003 World Championship gold medallist and a 2004 Olympic bronze medallist.

Running career
Born in Les Abymes, Guadeloupe, Arron arrived in Metropolitan France in 1990 and first trained with Fernand Urtebise, who also coached the former 400 metres hurdles and 4 × 400 metres relay world champion Stephane Diagana.

On 19 Aug 1998, Arron won the 100 metres gold medal at the 1998 European Championships in Budapest by finishing the final in a new European record time of 10.73 seconds. Her time of 10.73 seconds made her then the world's second-fastest ever, female 100 metres sprinter, behind Florence Griffith-Joyner (10.49 seconds, set in 1988). She also won the 4 × 100 metres relay gold medal at the same championships. She was named the 1998 European Women's Athlete of the Year.

In 2001, after a heavy training period in the US with John Smith and the HSI group, Arron quit training for a year, saying she was physically exhausted from the experience. "It was hell. Every morning I wondered how I was going to put up with the burden of training." She had a hip injury which kept her out of the 2001 World Championships.

Arron was also the anchor runner of the French 4 × 100 relay team which upset the heavy favourites the US to win the gold medal at the 2003 World Championships in Paris. She recovered from 3 m behind the newly crowned, 100 m 2003 World Champion, Torri Edwards, to give the home crowd at the Stade de France an unexpected joy.

Arron won her only Olympic medal, a bronze medal, in the 4 × 100 m relay at the 2004 Olympic Games in Athens, Greece.

In August 2005, Arron won a bronze medal in the 100 metres and 
200 metres at the 2005 World Championships.

At the 2008 Olympic Games in Beijing, Arron competed in the 100 metres event. In her first round heat, she placed first in front of Lauryn Williams and Tahesia Harrigan in a time of 11.37 sec to advance to the second round. But in the second round, she failed to advance to the semi-finals as her time of 11.36 sec was only the fourth fastest time of her heat, behind Debbie Ferguson, Oludamola Osayomi and Vida Anim, causing her elimination from the event.

As of April 2017, Arron is the world's seventh-fastest, female 100 metres sprinter (10.73 sec) of all time. Considering the controversy surrounding the performances of the world record-holder (10.49 sec, set in 1988), Florence Griffith-Joyner, many considered Arron's time of 10.73 sec. set during the 1998 European Championships to be the 'true' world record. Besides Griffith-Joyner, only Marion Jones, Carmelita Jeter, Shelly-Ann Fraser-Pryce, Elaine Thompson-Herah and Sha'Carri Richardson have run faster than Arron in the 100 metres.

In December 2012, Arron announced her retirement from athletics. She was expecting her second child then. She did not rule out the possibility of returning to athletics competition after the birth of her second child.

On 9 October 2013, Arron was awarded the Chevalier de la Légion d'honneur by French President François Hollande in the Élysée Palace.

Views on doping
Arron has voiced her annoyance with Marion Jones, her fiercest rival during her career: "She has lied for years [...] She treated everyone as idiots. I'm not shocked she is going to jail. Many people criticised me because I was always the one who lost in the Jones-Arron battle, even if I had very good results. We started running together in 1997. She has stolen my best years. Everything could have been different for me."

Family
In 2002, Arron gave birth to her first child, a son by the name of Ethan. On 16 May 2013, Arron gave birth to her second child, a daughter by the name of Cassandre. Cassandre's father Benjamin Compaoré, a French triple jumper, became Arron's companion in 2009. -

Achievements

Note: Results in brackets indicate a superior time achieved in an earlier round.

References

External links

 
 
 
 
 
 

1973 births
Living people
French female sprinters
Athletes (track and field) at the 2000 Summer Olympics
Athletes (track and field) at the 2004 Summer Olympics
Athletes (track and field) at the 2008 Summer Olympics
Olympic athletes of France
Guadeloupean female sprinters
French people of Guadeloupean descent
Olympic bronze medalists for France
World Athletics Championships medalists
European Athletics Championships medalists
Medalists at the 2004 Summer Olympics
Chevaliers of the Légion d'honneur
Olympic bronze medalists in athletics (track and field)
Mediterranean Games gold medalists for France
Athletes (track and field) at the 1997 Mediterranean Games
Black French sportspeople
European Athlete of the Year winners
Mediterranean Games medalists in athletics
World Athletics Championships winners
Olympic female sprinters